Ascelin may refer to:

 Ascelin of Lombardy mid-13th century Papal Ambassador to the Tartars (Mongols)
 Ascelin of Rochester (d. 1148) English Bishop of Rochester
 Adalberon, Bishop of Laon (d. 1030), French Bishop and poet

See also
 Anselm (disambiguation)